Mark McGough (born 14 March 1988) is an Australian former soccer player who is last known to have played as a forward for Heidelberg United.

Career

At the age of 15, McGough trialed for the youth academy of Derby County in the English second division. After that, he almost trialed for Club Atlético River Plate, one of Argentina's most successful clubs, before joining Northcote City in the Australian second division.

In 2011, he signed for Singaporean side Balestier Khalsa.</ref>

In 2013, McGough signed for Montalto Uffugo in the Italian fourth division.

References

External links
 
 Mark McGough at Soccerpunter

Australian soccer players
Living people
Singapore Premier League players
Expatriate footballers in Singapore
Balestier Khalsa FC players
Australian expatriate soccer players
Australian expatriate sportspeople in Singapore
Heidelberg United FC players
Moreland Zebras FC players
Northcote City FC players
Hume City FC players
1988 births
Association football forwards